Karen Inglis is an English self-published children's author.

Writing
Inglis' debut, The Secret Lake (2011), was aimed at the 8-11 age group, whereas subsequent have books been aimed at younger readers including the 3-5 range. A sequel to The Secret Lake, Return to the Secret Lake, was published in 2022 with a slightly older (8-12) audience in mind than the previous novel.

In 2018 Inglis published a practical guide book - How to Self-Publish and Market a Children's Book.

Other information
Inglis lives in Barnes, London.

Published works

References

External links
 

English children's writers
21st-century English women writers
Living people

Year of birth missing (living people)